Raheela Naeem (born 2 July 1976) is a Pakistani politician  who was a Member of the Provincial Assembly of the Punjab, from May 2013 to May 2018.

Early life and education
She was born on 2 July 1976 in Lahore.

She graduated from Government College for Women in Lahore  in 1997 and earned the degree of Bachelor of Arts.

Political career

She was elected to the Provincial Assembly of the Punjab as a candidate of Pakistan Muslim League (N) (PML-N) on a reserved seat for women in 2008 Pakistani general election.

She was re-elected to the Provincial Assembly of the Punjab  as a candidate of PML-N on a reserved seat for women in 2013 Pakistani general election.

She was re-elected to the Provincial Assembly of the Punjab  as a candidate of PML-N on a reserved seat for women in 2018 Pakistani general election.

References

Living people
Women members of the Provincial Assembly of the Punjab
Punjab MPAs 2013–2018
1976 births
Pakistan Muslim League (N) MPAs (Punjab)
Punjab MPAs 2008–2013
21st-century Pakistani women politicians